William Thacher Longstreth (January 1, 1920April 11, 2003) was a Republican member of the Philadelphia City Council who was perhaps best known for his long tenure and unique image.

Longstreth, a graduate of Princeton University, was an eighth-generation Philadelphian born to Quakers William Collins (b. 1882) and Nella ( Thacher) Longstreth, who married in 1917. William C. Longstreth owned the Longstreth Motor Car Company and his family lived in Haverford, Pennsylvania, and was affluent until the Wall Street Crash of 1929. Thacher was a cousin of President Herbert Hoover and his maternal grandmother, Ella Hoover Thacher was the president of the Woman's Christian Temperance Union for many years. In 1970, he led the Philadelphia Chamber of Commerce and spearheaded the drive to hold the annual Earth Day commemoration in Philadelphia. That event became one of the biggest Earth Day events in the nation. He was also instrumental in the creation of the Greater Delaware Valley Chapter of the National Multiple Sclerosis Society.  He was predeceased by his half sister, Nella Cameron Downward (1913-1997). His younger brother, Frank Hoover Longstreth (b. 1922) died in 2008.

He was a two-time Republican nominee for Mayor of Philadelphia, first in 1955, losing to Richardson Dilworth, and again in 1971, losing to Frank Rizzo.

He was initially elected to Philadelphia's City Council in 1967, resigning his seat to run for Mayor in 1971. While a member of City Council, he served as a sideline reporter on Philadelphia Eagles radio broadcasts on WIP in 1969 and 1970. Longstreth was again elected to Council in 1983, defeating incumbent councilwoman Beatrice Chernock for the at-large seat he had vacated twelve years earlier to run for Mayor. He would remain in office until his death. During his tenure on Council, Longstreth helped support the efforts of Edmund Bacon to bring an urban renaissance to Philadelphia. He was also well known for wearing bow ties and argyle socks.

He suffered from Parkinson's disease, and died of a pulmonary embolism while on vacation in Naples, Florida.

References

External links
 (archived)
City of Philadelphia Archives

|-

1920 births
2003 deaths
People from Haverford Township, Pennsylvania
Haverford School alumni
Princeton University alumni
United States Navy personnel of World War II
United States Navy officers
American Quakers
Pennsylvania Republicans
Philadelphia City Council members
20th-century American politicians
Deaths from pulmonary embolism